Fraternité Notre-Dame is a traditionalist Catholic order of  priests and nuns that is not in union with the Pope.

Origins
The origins of Fraternité Notre-Dame are in the reported apparitions of the Virgin Mary in Fréchou, France. They were allegedly received in 1977 by Jean Marie Kozik, a Frenchman of Polish origin, who was consecrated as a bishop in 1978 by the dissident and excommunicated Vietnamese Archbishop Ngô Đình Thục.

Today
Fraternité Notre-Dame operates religious and humanitarian missions on four continents. The order operates soup kitchens and weekly food pantries in Paris, New York City, Ulan Bator, Chicago, and San Francisco. Additionally, a hospital for the poor has been opened in Mongolia, and it has also operated humanitarian convoys to benefit those victimized by war in Croatia, Bosnia, Kosovo, and Rwanda.

Chicago
Since then Fraternité Notre-Dame nuns have become a fixture at numerous Chicago area farmer's markets selling traditional French pastries to raise funds for the group.

References

External links
 Official website

Independent Catholic denominations
Christian organizations established in 1977
History of Catholicism in France
Christian denominations established in the 20th century
Sects
Catholic dissident organizations
Traditionalist Catholicism